The Center for Great Apes’ mission is to provide a permanent sanctuary for orangutans and chimpanzees who have been rescued or retired from the entertainment industry, from research, or from the exotic pet trade; to educate the public about captive great apes and the threats to conservation of great apes in the wild; and to advocate for the end of the use of great apes as entertainers, research subjects, and pets.    

The Center for Great Apes, the only accredited orangutan sanctuary in North America, provides lifetime care with dignity for orangutans and chimpanzees, both endangered species. The Center for Great Apes has earned the highest possible rankings from both Charity Navigator (4 Star), and Guidestar's Platinum Seal of Transparency.  The Center for Great Apes, a private, non-profit, does not receive government funding and relies solely on the generosity of its members, private donors, and grants from foundations. The annual cost of caring for each ape including enrichment, nutrition, and medical, is approximately $25,000 per year. The sanctuary is a founding member of North American Primate Sanctuary Alliance (NAPSA) and is accredited by The Global Federation of Animal Sanctuaries.

Notable residents
 Bubbles – former companion of Michael Jackson.
 Bella – CareerBuilder 2004 Super Bowl XL campaign.
 Sam "Sammy" (former) – starred in the movie Dunston Checks In.
 Sandra – Orangutan declared a "non-human person" in Argentina after spending 20 years at Buenos Aires Zoo.
 Sunshine was born in England where her mother was owned by singer Tom Jones’ manager.  
Bo and Joe - formerly at CW Exotics facility featured in the Netflix series Tiger King
Marco is the oldest and smallest chimpanzee at the Center for Great Apes
Jonah and Jacob are twins. Jonah starred with Mark Wahlberg in the 2001 version of the Planet of the Apes and along with his twin brother worked in the original “Trunk Monkey” commercials. 
Mari, the orangutan, is one of several apes taken care of by the Center for Great Apes who have special needs. Mari lost both arms as an infant before arriving at the sanctuary; Knuckles, a chimpanzee, had cerebral palsy; and Allie has Chronic Inflammatory Demyelinating Polyneuropathy (CIDP), a condition, that in Allie's case, prevents the use of her legs or feet.

References

Further reading 

 "Super Bowl commercials: What happens to those CareerBuilder chimps?" (February 7, 2011) by Patti Ragan Christian Science Monitor
 
 Snap Judgement (Dec 24, 2020) The LookBack Special with Glynn Washington  
 Snap Judgment (Season 11 – Episode 6) Zoo Nebraska with Glynn Washington  
 The Week (Jan 8, 2015) Charity of the week: Center for Great Apes
 Sierra Magazine (April 2020) Weekly Roundup
 New York Times  (September 10, 2001) "Protecting Actors, Great and Small; As Hollywood Uses More Animals,Concerns Grow About Their Welfare." by Rick Lyman 
 People Magazine (November 2021) "8 Rescue Chimps Take 2,600-Mile Trip to Reach the Safety of Their New Florida Sanctuary Home" by Kelli Bender  
 Watauga Democrat (Aug 2021) "Work of Great Apes on display at Turchin Center" By Makaelah Walters
 Sarasota Magazine (Dec 2018) "Southwest Florida’s Center for Great Apes Celebrates Its 25th Anniversary" by Dyllan Furness  
 One Green Planet (2016) Why Car Dealership Ads Featuring Footage of Captive Orangutan Are Anything but Cute by Lauren Kearney
 Phys.org (2020) "Showbiz apes find peace through painting in Florida retirement" by Leila MacOr
 National Geographic (April 7, 2020) "This ‘hand-washing’ orangutan went viral—but the story isn’t true"  by Natasha Daly
 CNN (Nov 9, 2019) "Sandra the orangutan, freed from a zoo after being granted ‘personhood,’ settles into her new home"  by Alaa Elassar
 Christian Science Monitor (April 13, 2017) "Rescued chimpanzees and orangutans: This woman’s lifework is caring for them" by Gregory M. Lamb 
 New York Times (June 15, 2015) "Changing Perspectives Propel Chimp Protections" by James Gorman
 The Lane Report (2013) "Big Ass Fans makes major donation to Center for Great Apes Animal Sanctuary"
 Christian Science Monitor (Feb 2011) "Super Bowl commercials: What happens to those CareerBuilder chimps?"
 Reuters (Nov 2010) Caged chimpanzees move to spacious new home in Florida
 Live Science (August 14, 2008) Curtain Call For Hollywood's Orangutans  By Greg Soltis 

Animal charities based in the United States
Charities based in Florida
Environmental organizations based in Florida
Organizations established in 1993
Primate sanctuaries
1993 establishments in Florida
Tourist attractions in Hardee County, Florida